The June 2008 Hong Kong Rainstorm was a rainstorm in Hong Kong on 7 June 2008 that caused flooding and landslides. It resulted in 2 deaths and 16 injuries. The Hong Kong Observatory recorded 145.5mm of precipitation at its headquarters between 08:00 to 09:00, setting the highest one-hour precipitation record. A total of 307.1mm of precipitation was recorded during that day.

Precipitation 
An active trough had been affecting the South China coast since May 29th, 2008. Around dawn on June 7th, rainfall arrived in Hong Kong. The rainfall focused on Lantau Island, Kowloon and Hong Kong Island.Precipitation peaked between 08:00 and 09:00 with the Hong Kong Observatory headquarters recording 145.5mm of precipitation, an all time high. At Tung Chung, the total precipitation for the day surpassed 400mm and the Former Chief Executive, Donald Tsang, described it as a "once in a century" event. The Civil Engineering and Development Department of Hong Kong estimated it as a "once in 1100 years" occurrence.

Rainstorm Signals 
An Amber rainstorm signal was issued at 05:15, and it escalated to Red at 05:55. 112mm, 101mm, and 86mm of rain were recorded at the Eastern, Southern, and Sai Kung Districts respectively. The Hong Kong Observatory eventually issued a Black rainstorm signal at 06:40 and it was sustained for 4 hours and 20 minutes. Red replaced Black at 11:00 and was then replaced by Amber at 11:30. All signals were cancelled at 13:30. 
A Landslide Warning was maintained from 01:00 June 7th till 12:00 June 8th.

New Territories (Excluding Lantau Island) 
A retaining wall at Old Coffee Bay, Castle Peak Road, Tuen Mun fell and collapsed on a store, killing two shoppers who were cousins on a visit from mainland China. Despite the best efforts of firefighters and nearby residents, their bodies were not unearthed until 18:30.

Kowloon 
A section of Hung Hom Road collapsed at 13:00 on June 8th due to the previous day's heavy rainfall, causing detours.

Hong Kong Island 
A 1.5m flood was observed at Sheung Wan, as well as seawater back-flow. Village houses in Pokfulam were flooded, as were many roads, including Tai Hang Road, Pokfulam Road, Water Street and Hill Road, Wong Nai Chung Road, Tin Lok Lane and Wong Chuk Hang Road. A landslide was seen at Kennedy Town with 13 slopes pronounced high risk after the rainstorm.

Lantau Island 

North Lantau Highway experienced the most severe flood ever. Major landslip occurred in Tung Chung, blocking all lanes of the highway. Ground commute between Tung Chung, airport and downtown was completely halted, except for train service.

Effects 
- 326 landslips and 539 floods were reported
- 410 flights were delayed, 14 were canceled on June 7th
- Hong Kong Wetland Park and Disneyland Resort were temporarily closed in the morning
- Ngong Ping 360 service was halted 
- All banks and judiciary organizations closed for the day
- The central allocation of primary school was delayed 
- Many hiking trails were closed, detoured or permanently blocked, especially on Lantau Island

References 

June Rainstorm
Storms